Pulcinella Variations is a one-act ballet by Justin Peck, set to Igor Stravinsky's Pulcinella Suite, with costumes designed by Tsumori Chisato. The ballet premiered on September 28, 2017, danced by the New York City Ballet, at the David H. Koch Theater.

The choreography of Pulcinella Variations is more classical then other Peck's works, and the costumes were inspired by commedia dell’arte, which was also Stravinsky's inspiration when he wrote the music.

Original cast
Original cast:

Sterling Hyltin
Sara Mearns
Tiler Peck
Brittany Pollack
Indiana Woodward

Jared Angle
Andrew Scordato
Gonzalo Garcia
Anthony Huxley

Videography
In 2020, in response to the performance cancellation due to the coronavirus pandemic, the New York City Ballet released a recording of Pulcinella Variations, filmed in 2018 with most of the original cast returning, except Mearns, Pollack and Angle, whose roles were danced by Miriam Miller, Emilie Gerrity and Russell Janzen.

References

2017 ballet premieres
Ballets by Justin Peck
Ballets to the music of Igor Stravinsky
New York City Ballet repertory